Johanna Robbins (born May 26, 1992) is an American professional stock car racing driver. She is the winner of the 2010 Snowball Derby.

Racing career

Background
Long's father raced late models and she wanted to start racing karts when she was five years old; he allowed her to start racing when she was eight. She moved up into legends car racing, before turning to late models when she was twelve. In 2008, she won the Gulf Coast championship including races at Pensacola and Mobile, Alabama as well as the late model track championship at Five Flags Speedway in Pensacola.

NASCAR career

Long began her transition into NASCAR in 2009 by racing in a variety of series, including ASA Late Model Series, Pro Late Model, and ARCA. In 38 events, she had 27 top ten finishes, 17 top fives and five wins. Long ended 2009 by winning the pole position in the Snowball Derby, one of the few late model races in the off-season, which features drivers from around the United States.

She was expected to race in three Camping World races in 2010 but ended up racing in seven events. She raced in the Billy Ballew Motorsports truck in the middle of the season before the No. 15 team was shut down, and finished the year by racing in four events for her family-owned team, Panhandle Motorsports. With Ballew she qualified in all three races between 15th and 20th before finishing 17th, 34th and 20th. With Panhandle she had a season-high ninth place qualifying effort at Texas Motor Speedway with her best finish being a 20th-place result at the final race at Homestead-Miami Speedway. Long returned to Pensacola's Five Flags Speedway for the 2010 Snowball Derby, and won the 43rd annual running of the event by holding off Landon Cassill. She became the second woman to win the race after Tammy Jo Kirk did it in 1994.

She competed in the Camping World Truck Series in 2011, driving the family-owned No. 20 Toyota and running for Rookie-of-the-Year honors. Sponsorship issues forced her to run a partial season; her best finish was eleventh at Texas Motor Speedway.

For 2012, Long signed to drive the No. 70 Biomet/Foretravel Motorcoach Chevrolet, owned by ML Motorsports, in the NASCAR Nationwide Series, with former series champion David Green acting as a mentor. She finished 21st in her Nationwide Series debut at Daytona International Speedway, becoming the youngest woman driver ever to compete in the series. The team entered 21 races, finishing 20th in the standings. In 2013, still running a limited schedule, she fell to 23rd in points, and the team let her contract expire at the end of the season, soon folding.

Long spent the 2014 season racing Pro Late Models at Five Flags Speedway while searching for sponsorship.

On January 28, 2015, it was announced that Long would drive the No. 03 Chevrolet Camaro for Mike Affarano in the Xfinity Series. However, after several weeks of funding issues and her one and only attempt with the team resulted in a DNQ at Richmond, the team revealed on May 21 that Long has been released. On July 30, she joined Obaika Racing for the Xfinity race at Iowa Speedway.

Personal life
In 2016, Long married Kyle Busch Motorsports engineer and fellow short track driver Hunter Robbins. They have two children; Rory and Rhett.

Motorsports career results

NASCAR
(key) (Bold – Pole position awarded by qualifying time. Italics – Pole position earned by points standings or practice time. * – Most laps led.)

Xfinity Series

Camping World Truck Series 

 Season still in progress
 not eligible for series points

ARCA Re/Max Series
(key) (Bold – Pole position awarded by qualifying time. Italics – Pole position earned by points standings or practice time. * – Most laps led.)

References

External links
 

Living people
1992 births
Sportspeople from Pensacola, Florida
Racing drivers from Florida
NASCAR drivers
American female racing drivers
Racing drivers' wives and girlfriends
ARCA Menards Series drivers
21st-century American women